Mississippi County is the name of two counties in the United States:

 Mississippi County, Arkansas 
 Mississippi County, Missouri